Gloriana  is a genus of moths of the family Erebidae. The genus was erected by William Forsell Kirby in 1897.

Species
Gloriana dentilinea (Leech, 1900)
Gloriana ornata (Moore, 1882)

References

Calpinae